Jackson Gill (17 April 1881 – 21 July 1920) was a cricketer. He played in three first-class matches for British Guiana from 1901 to 1905.

See also
 List of Guyanese representative cricketers

References

External links
 

1881 births
1920 deaths
Cricketers from British Guiana